Edith Dircksey Cowan  ( Brown; 2 August 18619 June 1932) was an Australian social reformer who worked for the rights and welfare of women and children. She is best known as the first Australian woman to serve as a member of parliament. Cowan has been featured on the reverse of Australia's 50-dollar note since 1995.

Cowan was born at Glengarry station near Geraldton, Western Australia. She was the granddaughter of two of the colony's early settlers, Thomas Brown and John Wittenoom. Cowan's mother died when she was seven, and she was subsequently sent to boarding school in Perth. At the age of 15, her father, Kenneth Brown, was executed for the murder of her stepmother, making her an orphan. She subsequently lived with her grandmother in Guildford, Western Australia until her marriage at the age of 18. She and her husband would have five children together, splitting their time between homes in West Perth and Cottesloe.

In 1894, Cowan was one of the founders of the Karrakatta Club, the first women's social club in Australia. She became prominent in the women's suffrage movement, which saw women in Western Australia granted the right to vote in 1899. Cowan was also a leading advocate for public education and the rights of children (particularly those born to single mothers). She was one of the first women to serve on a local board of education, and in 1906 helped to found the Children's Protection Society, whose lobbying resulted in the creation of the Children's Court the following year. Cowan was a co-founder of the Women's Service Guild in 1909, and in 1911 helped establish a state branch of the National Council of Women.

Cowan was a key figure in the creation of the King Edward Memorial Hospital for Women, and became a member of its advisory board when it opened in 1916. She was made a justice of the Children's Court in 1915 and a justice of the peace in 1920. In 1921, Cowan was elected to the Legislative Assembly of Western Australia as a member of the Nationalist Party, becoming Australia's first female parliamentarian. She was defeated after just a single term, but maintained a high profile during her tenure and managed to secure the passage of several of her private member's bills.

Early life

Cowan was born on 2 August 1861 at Glengarry, a sheep station near Geraldton, Western Australia. She was the second child of Kenneth Brown, pastoralist and son of early York settlers Thomas and Eliza Brown, and his first wife Mary Eliza Dircksey Wittenoom, a teacher and the daughter of the colonial chaplain,  Wittenoom. Cowan's mother died in childbirth in 1868 when Cowan was only seven. She went to a Perth boarding school run by the Misses Cowan, sisters of her future husband. Her adolescence was shattered in 1876 by the ordeal of her father's trials and hanging for the murder, that year, of his second wife. He murdered his second wife by shooting her when they were packing. Cowan was a solitary person, committed nevertheless to social reforms which enhanced women's dignity and responsibility and which secured proper care for mothers and children.

After her father's death, she left her boarding school and moved to Guildford to live with her grandmother. There, she attended tuition of Canon Sweeting, a former headmaster of Bishop Hale's School who had taught a number of prominent men including John Forrest and Septimus Burt. According to her biographer, Sweeting's tuition left Cowan with "a life-long conviction of the value of education, and an interest in books and reading".

Community work

Cowan became involved with social issues and injustices in the legal system, especially with respect to women and children. In 1894, she helped found the Karrakatta Club, a group in which women "educated themselves for the kind of life they believed they ought to be able to take". In time, she became the club's president, life member, and trustee. The Karrakatta Club became involved in the campaign for women's suffrage, successfully gaining the vote for women in 1899.

After the turn of the century, she turned her eye to welfare issues. She was particularly concerned with women's health and the welfare of disadvantaged groups, such as disadvantaged children and prostitutes. She became extraordinarily active in women's organisations and welfare organisations, serving on numerous committees. The building of Perth's King Edward Memorial Hospital for Women in 1916 was largely a result of her efforts. She helped form the Women's Service Guilds in 1909 and was a co-founder of the Western Australia's National Council of Women, serving as president from 1913 to 1921 and vice-president until her death. Cowan was also a Western Australian delegate to the national assembly for 19 years.

In 1916, she became a Freemason, admitted to the Australian federation of Droit Humain.

She believed that children should not be tried as adults and, accordingly, founded the Children's Protection Society. The society had a major role in the subsequent introduction of children's courts. In 1915, she was appointed to the bench of the new court and continued on in this position for eighteen years. In 1920, she became one of the first female Justices of the Peace. Her great great nephew David Malcolm followed in her footsteps, by becoming Chief Justice of the Supreme Court of Western Australia in 1988.

During World War I, she collected food and clothing for soldiers at the front and coordinated efforts to care for returned soldiers. She became chairperson of the Red Cross Appeal Committee and was rewarded when, in 1920, she was appointed an Officer of the Order of the British Empire (OBE).

In her final years, she was an Australian delegate to the 1925 International Conference of Women held in the United States. She helped to found the Royal Western Australian Historical Society in 1926 and assisted in the planning of Western Australia's 1929 Centenary celebrations. Though she remained involved in social issues, illness forced her to withdraw somewhat from public life in later years.

Community positions held 
Beside being a Member of Parliament, Cowan held positions on many boards in Western Australia, in 1929 during the Centenary The West Australian published a list of these;

Politics

In 1921, Western Australia passed legislation allowing women to stand for parliament. At the age of 59, she stood as the Nationalist candidate for the Legislative Assembly seat of West Perth because she felt that domestic and social issues were not being given enough attention. She won a surprise victory, defeating the Attorney General, Thomas Draper, who had introduced the legislation that enabled her to stand. Cowan was the first woman to be elected to an Australian parliament. She campaigned for women's rights in parliament, pushing through legislation which allowed women to be involved in the legal profession. She succeeded in placing mothers in an equal position with fathers when their children died without having made a will and was one of the first to promote sex education in schools. However, she lost her seat at the 1924 election and failed to regain it in 1927.

Personal life

At the age of 18, on 12 November 1879, Edith married James Cowan, then Registrar of the Supreme Court. They lived at Scotstoun, 71 Malcolm Street, West Perth for most of their lives, but are also well known for having one of the first houses in Avonmore Terrace, Cottesloe, where they lived from 1896 to 1912.
Cowan was married in St George's Cathedral, Perth, Perth. She was one of the first women elected to the Anglican Synod in 1916.

Death and burial

Following an extended period of ill-health Cowan died of pancreatic cancer at the Avro Hospital, Subiaco on 9 June 1932, at the age of 70. After a short service at St. Mary's Church, West Perth, a large public funeral was held at Karrakatta Cemetery where she was buried.

Legacy

Two years after her death, the Edith Cowan Memorial Clock was unveiled at the entrance to Perth's Kings Park. Believed to be the first civic monument to an Australian woman, it was built in the face of persistent opposition which has been characterised as "representative of a gender bias operating at the time".

Her portrait featured on an Australian postage stamp in 1975, as part of a six-part "Australian Women" series. Australia Post honoured Edith again in 2021, for the centenary of her election, as Australia’s first woman parliamentarian. During the WAY 1979 sesquicentennial celebrations, a plaque was laid in St Georges Terrace in her honour. It is on the corner of Milligan Street and is for 1921.

In 1984, the federal Division of Cowan was created and named after her, and in January 1991 the Western Australian College of Advanced Education was renamed Edith Cowan University (ECU).

Her portrait appears on the Australian fifty dollar note, a polymer banknote that was first issued in October 1995. In 2019 the release of the latest $50 note caused a sensation when it was discovered that the word 'responsibility' in Edith Cowan's speech was spelt incorrectly, missing the last 'i'. In 1996, a plaque honouring her was placed in St George's Cathedral, Perth. There are references to her in the Centenary of Western Australian Women's Suffrage Memorial in Kings Park, and in a tapestry that was hung in King Edward Memorial Hospital in 2000 to honour women involved in the hospital.

In 1991, Edith Cowan University purchased the house in which Edith Cowan, her husband and family had resided at 71 Malcolm Street. They resided in the house from 1919 for approximately 20 years. The house was reconstructed on the university's Joondalup campus with the assistance of the West Coast College of TAFE. The reconstructed house opened in 1997 as Building 20 on that campus, and currently houses the Peter Cowan Writer's Centre.

Edith Cowan was added to the Victorian Honour Roll of Women in 2001.  Her life was the subject of the stage play "With Fire in Her Heart: the Edith Cowan Story" by Western Australian author and playwright Trevor Todd, in 2020.

Notes

References

Other sources

External links

 Edith Dircksey Cowan in Biographical Register of Members of the Parliament of Western Australia

1861 births
1932 deaths
19th-century Australian people
19th-century Australian women
20th-century Australian politicians
20th-century Australian women politicians
Australian suffragists
Burials at Karrakatta Cemetery
Members of the Western Australian Legislative Assembly
Australian Officers of the Order of the British Empire
Australian Freemasons
People from Geraldton
Women members of the Western Australian Legislative Assembly
Deaths from pancreatic cancer
Deaths from cancer in Western Australia